Michael Ayers may refer to:

Mike Ayers (born 1948), American football coach
Mike Ayers (ice hockey), American ice hockey coach and player
Michael R. Ayers (born 1935), British philosopher
Michael Ayers (boxer) (born 1965), British boxer